Kasmira was a kingdom   identified as the Kashmir Valley along the Jhelum River of modern Jammu and Kashmir.  During the epic ages this was one among the territories of the Naga race. The Kasmiras were allies of the Kuru king Duryodhana.

References in Mahabharata 
All references are listed as Mahabharata, Book number, Chapter Number. E.g.:- (6,9):- Mahabharata Book 6 Chapter 9

Kasmira along with neighbouring kingdoms 

Kasmira is mentioned as a kingdom of ancient India (Bharata Varsha) along with the Sindhu, the Sauviras, the Gandharvas, the Darsakas, the Abhisaras, the Utulas, the Saivalas, the Valhikas, and the Darvis. Then again there are the Sudras, the Abhiras, the Dardas, the Kasmiras, and the Pattis (6,9).

Kasmiras were mentioned along with the Pahlavas, the Daradas, and the various tribes of the Kiratas,  Yavanas, Sakas, Harahunas, Chinas, Tukharas, Sindhavas, Jagudas, Ramathas, Mundas, the inhabitants of the kingdom of women, Tanganas, Kekayas, and the Malavas as bringing tribute to Yudhishthira's Rajasuya sacrifice. (3,51)

The Daserakas, the Kasmirakas, the Aurasikas, the Pisachas, the Samudgalas, the Kamvojas, and the Vatadhanas were mentioned together and said to be vanquished by Vasudeva Krishna (7,11)

The Kashmiras and the Daradas, along with other tribes, were vanquished by Bhargava Rama (7,68).

The rivers of Kasmira 
The river Vitasta, is situated in the country of the Kasmiras and is the abode of the Naga Takshaka.(3,82). The rivers Chandrabhaga and the Vitasta have pure waters. The very many rivers flowing through Kasmira fall into the great river called Sindhu. (13,25)

Arjuna at Kasmira 
Arjuna during his military campaign to collect tribute to Yudhishthira's Rajasuya sacrifice, arrived at Kashmira.

Arjuna brought under his sway the seven tribes called Utsava-sanketa. Then he defeated the brave Kshatriyas of Kashmira and also King Lohita along with ten minor chiefs.  Then the Trigartas, the Daravas, the Kokonadas, and various other Kshatriyas advanced against the son of Pandu. (2,26)

Yudhishthira's Rajasuya sacrifice 
Kasmira king attended Yudhishthira's Rajasuya sacrifice (2,33).

The Kairatas, the Daradas, the Darvas, the Suras, the Vaiamakas, the Audumvaras, the Durvibhagas, the Kumaras, the Paradas along with the Vahlikas, the Kashmiras, the Ghorakas, the Hansakayanas, the Sivis, the Trigartas, the Yauddheyas, the ruler of Madras and the Kaikeyas, the Amvashtas, the Kaukuras, the Tarkshyas, the Vastrapas along with the Palhavas, the Vashatayas, the Mauleyas along with the Kshudrakas, and the Malavas, the Paundrayas, the Kukkuras, the Sakas and many others brought tribute to Pandava King Yudhishthira's Rajasuya sacrifice. (2,51)

Other references 
Kasmira king was mentioned as one among the great kings along with Alarka, Aila, Karandhama, Daksha, etc. (13,165)
Kashmerean mare is mentioned at (4,9)

See also 
Kingdoms of Ancient India
Paisachi

Sources 
Mahabharata of Krishna Dwaipayana Vyasa, translated to English by Kisari Mohan Ganguli

External links

Kingdoms in the Mahabharata